Aviones de cristal, is the third studio album from Alex Ubago. It was released on September 25, 2006 in Spain. It was certified Gold in both Spain and Mexico.

Track listing

CD

DVD

Sales and certifications

References

2006 albums
Álex Ubago albums